Ditch the Label is a global youth charity, dedicated to helping young people through a range of issues, such as mental wellbeing, bullying, identity, relationships and digital literacy.

They are a digital charity, which means that most of the support provided is through their website and partnerships with games and social networks. They additionally operate Ditch the Label Education, which provides free educational resources for schools and colleges.

History

Infancy 
In 2005, after 10 years of ignoring it and telling the teachers, founder and current CEO of Ditch the Label Liam Hackett took to the Internet to post about his experiences of being bullied. He talked about the extreme verbal and physical bullying he had experienced, including his hospitalisation after being attacked by a group of people from school. Overnight, hundreds of people came together, united by their experiences.

A community rapidly grew. In 2006 Hackett launched a specific MySpace profile to host the conversations and named it ‘Ditch the Label’.

Hackett recognised the potential of Ditch the Label and approached the local Chamber of Commerce in 2007. Aged 16, he became the first person below the age of 18 to receive a grant in his local area to develop a Ditch the Label website.

In 2012, Hackett graduated with a degree in business and management from the University of Sussex and immediately registered Ditch the Label as a legal entity and began to develop the organisation.

Official registration (2014) 
Income requirements had disqualified Ditch the Label from becoming a recognised charity. Gaining charity status was required in order to attract funding. In March 2014, Ditch the Label was officially registered as a charity in the UK.

Expansion to USA and Mexico (2015–2016) 
In 2015, Ditch the Label announced plans to expand across the United States and Mexico, aiming to support 500,000 young bullying victims. 2016 also saw the launch of the fifth and most comprehensive Annual Bullying Survey in the House of Commons of the United Kingdom.

Research

The Cyberbullying Report (2013)
This report combined a bullying-related data set of over 10,000 young people with key questions surrounding cyberbullying and the use of integrated digital technology within the lives of young people. Upon publication in October 2013, media publications were quick to respond; turning the findings of the report into global headlines. As a result, the report went on to consult Government, social networks, schools, colleges and other organisations in their counter cyberbullying strategy.

The Annual Bullying Survey (2013–present)
Each year the organisation partners with schools and colleges across the UK, to conduct a survey which highlights the current climate of bullying amongst 13 - 18 year olds. The reports came with tips and advice for schools, colleges, parents and guardians, Government and young people on how to reduce the effects and prominence of bullying.

The Gender Report (2016) 
This report covered the topic of gender and how it can enable and disable young people aged 13–25 throughout the United Kingdom and internationally. The research was focused on the definition of gender, gender roles and the bullying and discrimination young people experience as a result of not conforming to societal norms.

Masculinity and Misogyny in the Digital Age (2016) 
In conjunction with leading social intelligence company Brandwatch, Ditch the Label explored misogynistic behaviour and ideas of masculinity on Twitter by analysing 19 million Tweets over a four-year period. The report was supported by British politician Caroline Lucas and subsequently presented at a parliamentary reception in the House of Commons of the United Kingdom in October 2016.

Exposed: The Scale of Transphobia Online 
The research analysed 10 million posts on the topic of transgender identity across the UK and the US over a period of three-and-a-half years. It uncovered 1.5 million transphobic comments amid the wider conversation around transgender people.

Partnerships

Ditch the Label and Habbo (2013–2016)
In August 2013, the organisation joined Finnish youth virtual social networking service Habbo to extend their support to those who had experienced bullying. The organisation used Habbo as an online help centre for the virtual community to provide support and advice to both the targets and perpetrators of bullying.

The organisation also ran bullying-awareness campaigns on the virtual social network.

Ditch the Label and Axe/Lynx (2016–present) 
Based on findings from the 2016 edition of the Annual Bullying Survey which established that the majority of those who bully are men, Ditch the Label joined forces with brand Axe (known in the UK as Lynx) to give young men the tools and resources they need to stand up to bullying and be comfortable with who they are – without the pressures and limits of traditional masculinity.

Ditch the Label are aiming to help at least 474,000 people through their partnership with Axe/Lynx.

Ditch the Label and Tumblr (2020–present) 
Tumblr and Ditch the Label created a digital literacy campaign entitled, World Wide What, with its aim to help make the internet “a better, safer, and more place for everyone,” using informative videos and more.

Celebrity ambassadors
 Tyger Drew-Honey 
 Ben Cohen
 Thomas Turgoose from This Is England
 Josh Blue, comedian
 Bully band
 Sunflower Bean band
 Tom Rosenthal from Friday Night Dinner
 Stefanie Reid Paralympian
 Gok Wan
 Christian Jessen
 Thelma Madine from Big Fat Gypsy Weddings
 Latrice Royale from RuPaul's Drag Race
 Bea Miller
Holly Hagan from Geordie Shore
 Little Mix

References

External links
 Official Website

2012 establishments in the United Kingdom
Non-profit organisations based in the United Kingdom
Anti-bullying charities
Charities based in the United Kingdom